The Pedras de abalar, Galician for "oscillating stones", are several large stones in Galicia, Spain, that can easily be moved by a person or the wind. One of these is in Muxía, and is known as the "Pedra da Barca". These are large stones that are balanced on a point, so that they can be moved back and forth easily, or even wiggle in response to the wind. These were used at one time to determine the guilt or innocence of those accused of serious crimes. In English, such stones have been called rocking stones, or logan stones.

The Pedras de Abalar in Galicia are:
 Cíes Island
 Corbelle (Vilalba)
 Sande (Ourense)
 Paradela (near Cambados)
 Pedra da Barca (near Muxía)
 Meixide (Viana do Bolo)
 Vilamaior de Boullosa (in the Limia River region)
 Pena da Conga (Melide)
 Castro do Faro (O Porriño)
 Pena de Embade de Ferrol (demolished, 1755)

Other pedra de abalar include the "Pena da Conga" in Melide, and the "Castro do Faro" in O Porriño.

References

External links
 Historia de Galicia de don Benito Vicetto, tomo I, Ferrol 1865.

Stones
Galician mythology

fr:Pierre branlante
gl:Pedra de abalar